Below is the list of populated places in Bayburt Province, Turkey by the districts. In the following lists first place in each list is the administrative center of the district.

Bayburt
 Bayburt
 Adabaşı, Bayburt	
 Ağören, Bayburt	
 Akçakuzu, Bayburt	
 Akduran, Bayburt	
 Aksaçlı, Bayburt	
 Akşar, Bayburt	
 Alapelit, Bayburt	
 Alıçlık, Bayburt	
 Ardıçgöze, Bayburt	
 Armutlu, Bayburt	
 Arpalı, Bayburt	
 Arslandede, Bayburt	
 Aşağıçımağıl, Bayburt	
 Aşağıkışlak, Bayburt	
 Aşağıpınarlı, Bayburt	
 Aydıncık, Bayburt	
 Balca, Bayburt	
 Balkaynak, Bayburt	
 Ballıkaya, Bayburt	
 Başçımağıl, Bayburt	
 Bayırtepe, Bayburt	
 Bayraktar, Bayburt	
 Buğdaylı, Bayburt	
 Çakırbağ, Bayburt	
 Çalıdere, Bayburt	
 Çamdere, Bayburt	
 Çamlıkoz, Bayburt	
 Çayırözü, Bayburt	
 Çayıryolu, Bayburt	
 Çerçi, Bayburt	
 Çiğdemtepe, Bayburt	
 Çorak, Bayburt	
 Dağçatı, Bayburt	
 Dağtarla, Bayburt	
 Danişment, Bayburt	
 Darıca, Bayburt	
 Değirmencik, Bayburt	
 Demirışık, Bayburt	
 Demirkaş, Bayburt	
 Dikmetaş, Bayburt	
 Dövmekaya, Bayburt	
 Erenli, Bayburt	
 Gençosman, Bayburt	
 Gez, Bayburt	
 Gökçeli, Bayburt	
 Gökler, Bayburt	
 Gökpınar, Bayburt	
 Göldere, Bayburt	
 Göloba, Bayburt	
 Güder, Bayburt	
 Güllüce, Bayburt	
 Gümüşsu, Bayburt	
 Güneydere, Bayburt	
 Güzelce, Bayburt	
 Hacıoğlu, Bayburt	
 Harmanözü, Bayburt	
 Helva, Bayburt	
 Heybetepe, Bayburt	
 Iğdır, Bayburt	
 Kabaçayır, Bayburt	
 Karlıca, Bayburt	
 Karşıgeçit, Bayburt	
 Kavacık, Bayburt	
 Kavakyanı, Bayburt	
 Kıratlı, Bayburt	
 Kırkpınar, Bayburt	
 Kitre, Bayburt	
 Koçbayır, Bayburt	
 Konursu, Bayburt	
 Kop, Bayburt	
 Kopuz, Bayburt	
 Kozluk, Bayburt	
 Kurbanpınar, Bayburt	
 Kurugüney, Bayburt	
 Maden, Bayburt	
 Manas, Bayburt	
 Masat, Bayburt	
 Mutlu, Bayburt	
 Nişantaşı, Bayburt	
 Ortaçımağıl, Bayburt	
 Oruçbeyli, Bayburt	
 Ozansu, Bayburt	
 Örence, Bayburt	
 Pamuktaş, Bayburt	
 Pelitli, Bayburt	
 Petekkaya, Bayburt	
 Polatlı, Bayburt	
 Rüştü, Bayburt	
 Sakızlı, Bayburt	
 Salkımsu, Bayburt	
 Sancaktepe, Bayburt	
 Saraycık, Bayburt	
 Sarıhan, Bayburt	
 Sarımeşe, Bayburt	
 Seydiyakup, Bayburt	
 Sığırcı, Bayburt	
 Sırakayalar, Bayburt	
 Soğukgöze, Bayburt	
 Söğütlü, Bayburt	
 Taht, Bayburt	
 Taşburun, Bayburt	
 Taşçılar, Bayburt	
 Taşkesen, Bayburt	
 Taşocağı, Bayburt	
 Tepetarla, Bayburt	
 Tomlacık, Bayburt	
 Uğrak, Bayburt	
 Uğurgeldi, Bayburt	
 Uluçayır, Bayburt	
 Üzengili, Bayburt	
 Yanıkçam, Bayburt	
 Yaylalar, Bayburt	
 Yaylapınar, Bayburt	
 Yazyurdu, Bayburt	
 Yedigöze, Bayburt	
 Yeniköy, Bayburt	
 Yerlice, Bayburt	
 Yeşilyurt, Bayburt	
 Yolaltı, Bayburt	
 Yoncalı, Bayburt	
 Yukarıkışlak, Bayburt

Aydıntepe
 Aydıntepe
 Akbulut, Aydıntepe
 Alaca, Aydıntepe
 Aşağıkırzı, Aydıntepe
 Başpınar, Aydıntepe
 Çatıksu, Aydıntepe
 Çayırköprü, Aydıntepe
 Çiğdemlik, Aydıntepe
 Dumlu, Aydıntepe
 Erikdibi, Aydıntepe
 Gümüşdamla, Aydıntepe
 Günbuldu, Aydıntepe
 İncili, Aydıntepe
 Kavlatan, Aydıntepe
 Kılıçkaya, Aydıntepe
 Pınargözü, Aydıntepe
 Sırataşlar, Aydıntepe
 Sorkunlu, Aydıntepe
 Suludere, Aydıntepe
 Şalcılar, Aydıntepe
 Yanoba, Aydıntepe
 Yapracık, Aydıntepe
 Yazlık, Aydıntepe
 Yukarıkırzı, Aydıntepe

Demirözü
 Demirözü
 Akyaka, Demirözü
 Bayrampaşa, Demirözü
 Beşpınar, Demirözü
 Çağıllı, Demirözü
 Çakırözü, Demirözü
 Çatalçeşme, Demirözü
 Çimentepe, Demirözü
 Damlıca, Demirözü
 Devetaşı, Demirözü
 Dikmetaş, Demirözü
 Elmalı, Demirözü
 Eymür, Demirözü
 Gökçedere, Demirözü
 Güçlü, Demirözü
 Güvercindere, Demirözü
 Işıkova, Demirözü
 Kalecik, Demirözü
 Karayaşmak, Demirözü
 Kavaklı, Demirözü
 Otlukbeli, Demirözü
 Petekli, Demirözü
 Pınarcık, Demirözü
 Serenli, Demirözü
 Yakupabdal, Demirözü
 Yazıbaşı, Demirözü
 Yelpınar, Demirözü
 Yukarıpınarlı, Demirözü

References

Bayburt Province
Bayburt
List